Carnegie Hall Concert is a live album by saxophonist Gerry Mulligan and trumpeter Chet Baker. The album was recorded at Carnegie Hall in 1974 and released on the CTI label both as a double LP and as two separate volumes. In 1995 the album was re-released as a CD with an additional track.

Reception 

The Allmusic review by Scott Yanow states: "At this 1974 concert baritonist Gerry Mulligan and trumpeter Chet Baker had one of their very rare reunions; it would be only the second and final time that they recorded together after Mulligan's original quartet broke up in 1953. Oddly enough, a fairly contemporary rhythm section was used. However, some of the old magic was still there between the horns".

Track listing 
All compositions by Gerry Mulligan except where noted
 "Line for Lyons" – 8:16
 "Margarine" (Hal Galper) – 5:59 Additional track on CD reissue
 "For an Unfinished Woman" – 8:51
 "My Funny Valentine" (Richard Rodgers, Lorenz Hart) – 8:42
 "Song for Strayhorn" – 9:42
 "It's Sandy at the Beach" – 9:39
 "K-4 Pacific" – 11:46
 "There Will Never Be Another You" (Harry Warren, Mack Gordon) – 6:53
 "Bernie's Tune" (Bernie Miller, Jerry Leiber, Mike Stoller) – 7:55

Personnel 
Gerry Mulligan – baritone saxophone (tracks 1, 3-7 & 9)
Chet Baker – trumpet (tracks 1, 2, 4-6, 8 & 9) vocal (track 8)
Ed Byrne – trombone (tracks 2 & 8)
Bob James – piano, electric piano
Dave Samuels – vibraphone, percussion (tracks 1-3 & 6-9)
John Scofield – guitar (tracks 1-3 & 5-9)
Ron Carter – bass
Harvey Mason – drums

References 

Chet Baker live albums
Gerry Mulligan live albums
1975 live albums
CTI Records live albums
Albums produced by Creed Taylor
Albums recorded at Carnegie Hall